Thibaut Fauconnet (born 23 April 1985) is a French short track speed skater. He represented France at the 2010 Winter Olympics in Vancouver and at the 2014 Winter Olympics in Sochi.

References

1985 births
Living people
French male short track speed skaters
Olympic short track speed skaters of France
Short track speed skaters at the 2010 Winter Olympics
Short track speed skaters at the 2014 Winter Olympics
Short track speed skaters at the 2018 Winter Olympics
Universiade medalists in short track speed skating
Sportspeople from Dijon
Universiade gold medalists for France
Universiade bronze medalists for France
Competitors at the 2011 Winter Universiade
21st-century French people